Le train bleu  is a one-act ballet choreographed by Bronislava Nijinska to music by Darius Milhaud for Serge Diaghilev's Ballets Russes, based on a scenario by Jean Cocteau. The title was taken from the night train called Le Train Bleu, which transported wealthy passengers from Calais to the Mediterranean Sea.

The ballet is set on the fashionable French Riviera and has a sporting theme, with swimmers, tennis players, and weight lifters. Henri Laurens supplied a Cubist beach scene and Coco Chanel outfitted the cast in sportswear. The curtain was painted after Deux femmes courant sur la plage, a 1922 work by Pablo Picasso.

The ballet was first performed on 20 June 1924 at the Théâtre des Champs-Élysées in Paris, with Nijinska, who played a tennis player based on Suzanne Lenglen, Lydia Sokolova, Anton Dolin and Leon Woizikowski in the leading roles. The orchestra was conducted by André Messager.

Notes

 Richard Buckle's biography of Diaghilev made a mistake in citing the setting as Deauville.  Deauville was a fashionable resort in Normandy, and it was not on the line of the Blue Train.

References
 Au, Susan (2002). Ballet and Modern Dance. Thames and Hudson Ltd. 
 Grumbach, Didier (2008). Histoires de la mode. Paris: Éditions du Regard. 
 New York Times article by Gay Morris, 4 March 1990

Ballets by Darius Milhaud
Ballets by Bronislava Nijinska
Ballets by Jean Cocteau
Ballets designed by Coco Chanel
1924 ballet premieres
Works about rail transport